Sebastián Támara Manrrique (born 10 May 1996) is a Colombian professional footballer who plays as forward.

References

1996 births
Living people
Colombian footballers
Atlético Nacional footballers
Association football forwards
People from Cúcuta